This is a list of Nigerian architects. An architect is someone who plans, designs, and manage the construction of buildings and structures of all kinds.

Nigerian architects

 Suraj Abdurrahman 
 Olajumoke Adenowo
 Kunlé Adeyemi
 Halima Tayo Alao
 Ibiyinka Alao
 David Aradeon
 Victor Attah
 Nnimmo Bassey
 Ibrahim Bunu
 Mohammed Daggash
 Fifi Ejindu
 Alex Ifeanyichukwu Ekwueme
 Lara George
 John Godwin and Gillian Hopwood
 Felix Ibru
 Tom Ikimi
 Darius Ishaku
 Ola-dele Kuku
 Olufemi Majekodunmi
 Demas Nwoko
 Samuel Oboh
 Tosin Oshinowo
 Vop Osili
 David Oyedepo
 Musa Mohammed Sada
 Namadi Sambo
 Lanre Towry-Coker

References 
 

Nigerian architects
Architects